Kal-e Zorat (also Romanized as Kal-e Z̄orat and Kal Zorrat) is a village in Shamil Rural District, Takht District, Bandar Abbas County, Hormozgan Province, Iran. At the 2006 census, its population was 378, in 92 families.

References 

Populated places in Bandar Abbas County